The Cambridge Handbook of Phonology is a 2007 book edited by Paul de Lacy in which the authors deal with different aspects of phonological research in the generative grammar. Michael Kenstowicz, Sabine Zerbian and Jennifer L. Smith have reviewed the book.

Essays
 Introduction: aims and content, Paul de Lacy 
 1- Themes in phonology, Paul de Lacy
 Part I - Conceptual issues
 2 - The pursuit of theory, Alan Prince
 3 - Functionalism in phonology, Matthew Gordon
 4 - Markedness in phonology,  Keren Rice
 5 - Derivations and levels of representation, John J. McCarthy
 6 - Representation, John Harris
 7- Contrast, Donca Steriade
 Part II - Prosody
 8 -The syllable, Draga Zec
 9 - Feet and metrical stress, René Kager
 10 - Tone, Moira Yip
 11 - Intonation, Carlos Gussenhoven
12- The interaction of tone, sonority, and prosodic structure, Paul de Lacy
 Part III - Segmental phenomena
 13 - Segmental features, T. A. Hall
 14 - Local assimilation and constraint interaction, Eric Baković
 15 - Harmony, Diana Archangeli and Douglas Pulleyblank
 16 - Dissimilation in grammar and the lexicon, John D. Alderete and Stefan A. Frisch
 Part IV - Internal interfaces
 17 - The phonetics–phonology interface, John Kingston
 18 - The syntax–phonology interface, Hubert Truckenbrodt
 19 - Morpheme position, Adam Ussishkin
 20 - Reduplication, Suzanne Urbanczyk
 Part V - External interfaces
 21 - Diachronic phonology, Ricardo Bermúdez-Otero
 22 - Variation and optionality, Arto Anttila
 23 - Acquiring phonology, Paula Fikkert
 24 - Learnability, Bruce Tesar
 25 - Phonological impairment in children and adults, Barbara Bernhardt and Joseph Paul Stemberger

References

External links 
 The Cambridge Handbook of Phonology

2007 non-fiction books
Edited volumes
Phonology books
Cambridge University Press books
Handbooks and manuals